South Sudan competed at the 2020 Summer Olympics in Tokyo. Originally scheduled to take place from 24 July to 9 August 2020, the Games have been postponed to 23 July to 8 August 2021, due to the COVID-19 pandemic. This was the nation's second appearance at the Summer Olympics, since its debut in 2016.

Competitors
The following is the list of number of competitors in the Games.

Athletics

South Sudan received the universality slots from the World Athletics to send two track and field athletes (one per gender) to the Olympics.

Track & road events

References

Olympics
2020
Nations at the 2020 Summer Olympics